Linshu County is a county of southern Shandong province, People's Republic of China, bordering Jiangsu province to the south and east. It is under the administration of Linyi City.

Administrative divisions
As 2012, this County is divided to 11 towns and 1 townships.
Towns

Townships
Zhucang Township

Climate

References

External links 
 Official homepage

 
Counties of Shandong
Linyi